This is a list of collected editions of material published by Dark Horse Comics as ongoing and limited series. For collected editions reprinting webcomics and material originally published by other companies, including manga and manhwa series that were translated and distributed in America, see the List of Dark Horse Comics reprints.

0-9

A

N

P

S

X

External links 
 
 Dark Horse Comics at the Big Comic Book Database

References 

Dark Horse Comics collected editions